Prosopography of the Later Roman Empire (abbreviated as PLRE) is a work of Roman prosopography published in a set of three volumes collectively describing many of the people attested to have lived in the Roman Empire from AD 260, the date of the beginning of Gallienus' sole rule, to 641, the date of the death of Heraclius. Sources cited include histories, literary texts, inscriptions, and miscellaneous written sources. Individuals who are known only from dubious sources (e.g., the Historia Augusta), as well as identifiable people whose names have been lost, are included with signs indicating the reliability.

A project of the British Academy, the work set out with the goal of doing 

The volumes were published by Cambridge University Press, and involved many authors and contributors. Arnold Hugh Martin Jones, John Robert Martindale, and John Morris were the principal editors.
Volume 1, published on March 2, 1971, comes to 1,176 pages and covers the years from 260 to 395.
Volume 2, published on October 9, 1980, comes to 1,355 pages and covers the years from 395 to 527.
Volume 3, published on October 15, 1992, is itself a two-volume boxed set coming to a total of 1,626 pages and covering the years from 527 to 641.

The Prosopography of the Byzantine World project aims to extend the coverage to the year 1265.

References 

1971 non-fiction books
1980 non-fiction books
1992 non-fiction books
Roman Empire in late antiquity
Prosopography of ancient Rome
Biographical dictionaries
Prosopography of the Byzantine Empire
Books about the Byzantine Empire